The Jacobs Block, also known as the National Clothing House, is an 1870s historic building encompassing addresses in the 400 Block of Washington Street and the 100 Block of North Fourth Street in Oregon, Illinois. The Jacobs Block is part of Ogle County's only nationally designated historic district. The area, known as the Oregon Commercial Historic District, was added to the National Register of Historic Places in August 2006. The building, listed as a contributing structure to the historic district, is the Oregon Historic District's largest.

Notes

Buildings and structures in Oregon Commercial Historic District
Historic district contributing properties in Illinois
Commercial buildings on the National Register of Historic Places in Illinois